Affinity Lancashire is a shopping and leisure outlet in the port town of Fleetwood, Lancashire, England. It is owned by Global Mutual Ltd and managed by Savills UK.

Affinity Lancashire is located adjacent to Wyre Dock and marina. Retailers include - Body Shop, Cadbury, Claire's Accessories, Clarks Outlet, Mountain Warehouse, Hallmark Cards, Regatta, Home Bargains, Next, Sports Direct, Moss Bros, The Fragrance Shop and The Works among others. They currently home over 40 named brands.

The centre promises up to 60% off RRP all year round, with new season and outlet stock available in all stores.

It is home several other hospitality retailers, including McDonald's, Subway, Costa Coffee and the Coffee Box & Bistro.

The site opened 11 July 1995 as part of a regeneration scheme for the docks. In 2006 the outlet received a £8.6 million revamp which included the opening of new stores and dozens of new jobs.

In 2018 the centre went through a re-branding. This involved the renaming of the site to become Affinity Lancashire, leaving behind its former name Freeport Fleetwood. Ironically this wasn't the centre's official name, it had just been a Freeport branded site, in Fleetwood. This change gave the site a much needed relaunch, and inclusion into a group of outlet centres across the UK; Affinity Lancashire, Affinity Staffordshire, Affinity Devon and Affinity Sterling Mills.

The outdoor centre is dog-friendly and is known for its seasonal, free family events.

Affinity Lancashire has parking spaces for up to 700 vehicles and ten coaches. It is served directly by the Blackpool Transport bus service 1 and is a five-minute walk from the Fisherman's Walk tram stop on the Blackpool Tramway.

The centre is fully accessible and provides free wheelchair hire.

References

Shopping centres in Lancashire
Buildings and structures in Fleetwood